This article lists political parties in the Cayman Islands.
A political party is a political organization subscribing to a certain ideology or formed around very special issues with the aim to participate in power, usually by participating in elections.  
See political party for a more comprehensive discussion.
The Cayman Islands had a non-partisan system, but it evolved into a two-party system.

Active parties

Defunct parties
Cayman Vanguard Party
National Democratic Party
Cayman Democratic Party

See also
 Lists of political parties

 
Political parties
Cayman Islands
Cayman Islands
Political parties